The BYD Song (after the Song dynasty) is a series of compact Crossover Utility Vehicle (CUV) developed by BYD. Besides the completely different Song Max compact MPV, there are three compact crossovers in the Song lineup, sold concurrently: the original 1st-gen Song renamed Song classic, the slightly larger Song Pro, and the even more upmarket Song Plus. It's competitor worldwide is Luxgen U6.



First generation (2015–2019) 

The first generation BYD Song started out as the BYD S3 before BYD launched the "Dynasty" series vehicles. The Song was later launched as a minor facelift, and later a second facelift updating the BYD Song with the new "Dragon face" design language.

BYD S3 
The BYD S3 is a compact crossover debuted on the 2015 Shanghai Auto Show in April 2015. It was positioned below the mid-size BYD S6 crossover, and is BYD's first entry to the compact crossover market. Initial plans were similar to the petrol powered BYD F3 compact sedan and BYD S6 mid-size crossover which spawned the BYD Qin and BYD Tang hybrid variants using the Chinese dynasty naming system. However, later the BYD S3 was named simply the BYD Song for all variants including the ICE engined version, plug-in hybrid version, and electric versions.

BYD Song 
In April 2015, the BYD Song debuted at the 2015 Shanghai Auto Show. In October 2015, the BYD Song was launched. Two powertrains was offered at launch. The 1.5 litre engine could be had with either a 6-speed manual gearbox or a 6-speed automatic gearbox while the 2.0 litre engine could only be had with a 6-speed DCT gearbox. Originally called the BYD S3, BYD later changed the name of the crossover to simply Song. Early models with S3 badging has black graphic details on the front bumpers and regular BYD badge instead of the single body color and Dynasty-badging Song.

2018 Song facelift 
A facelift was launched in 2018 featuring the new BYD dragon face and connected tail lamps. Despite being marketed as a "brand new generation", the 2018 model shares the same body as the previous models.

Song DM (Dual-mode) 
Just like the F3DM compact car and F6DM prototype, BYD launched the Song DM PHEV in April 2017. The Song DM is nearly identical to the regular Song apart from the badging.

Song EV300 and EV400 
The Song EV300 and the Song EV400 are both electric versions of the BYD Song based on the regular petrol-powered BYD Song, and both use  and  electric motors. As for the exterior appearances, the EV300 is identical to the regular Song and Song DM, while the EV400 received redesigned bumpers.

Second generation (Song Pro; 2019–present) 

By early 2019, news of a new crossover with an internal code "SA2" was released, teasing a Chinese "A+ segment" (Slightly larger than the international C-segment compact cars) crossover featuring the "Dragon Face 2.0", second generation BYD Dragon face design language.

The second generation BYD Song is available in three different powertrains, namely the petrol-powered Song Pro, the fully electric Song Pro EV and the plug-in hybrid Song Pro DM.

Song Pro
The petrol version Song Pro is powered by the same 1.5 liter turbo engine producing .

Song Pro EV

Song Pro DM

Song Pro DM-i
The Song Pro received a facelift and was updated with the DM-i powertrain from December 2021 for the 2022 model year. From 2022, the DM-i is the only remaining Song Pro model on sale. The Song Pro DM-i is powered by a 1.5-litre plug-in hybrid engine connected with the EHS system producing 173 kW and 0 to 100 km/h acceleration is done in 7.9 secs. Transmission is a CVT-type gearbox.

Song Plus (2020-)

In September 2020, BYD launched a crossover SUV named BYD Song Plus. Compared to the Song Pro, the newly introduced model is longer, wider and lower, and positioned as a more "upmarket" offering. The vehicle was initially offered only with an internal combustion engine; an all-electric variant joined the lineup later.

The electric variant is equipped with BYD's LFP-based blade battery, just like the Han electric sedan. Its front-end styling, different than in the ICE variant, also resembles the Han.

References

External links 
 Official website (in Chinese)

BYD vehicles
Compact sport utility vehicles
Front-wheel-drive vehicles
All-wheel-drive vehicles
Cars of China
Cars introduced in 2015
Crossover sport utility vehicles
Plug-in hybrid vehicles
Production electric cars